The 2017 Florida State Seminoles baseball team represented Florida State University during the 2017 NCAA Division I baseball season. The Seminoles play their home games at Mike Martin Field at Dick Howser Stadium as a member of the Atlantic Coast Conference. They are led by head coach Mike Martin, in his 38th season at Florida State.

Florida State finished the 2016 season with a 41–22 record, winning 16 conference games, and finishing as the runner-up in the ACC Tournament. The Seminoles qualified for the NCAA Tournament for the thirty-ninth consecutive year, where they won the Tallahassee Regional but were eliminated by Florida in the Gainesville Super Regional. Prior to the start of the season, Florida State was picked to finish first in the Atlantic Division as well as the ACC, while shortstop Taylor Walls, catcher Cal Raleigh, infielder Dylan Busby and outfielder Jackson Lueck were named preseason All-American players.

Despite failing to finish with a winning record in ACC play for the first time, the Seminoles went on to win the ACC Tournament to secure a spot in the NCAA Tournament as the twelfth overall seed. Eventually advancing to the Super Regionals, Florida State went on to become just the 21st team to ever lose their first game and come back to win four straight to take the regional, going on to make their first appearance at the College World Series in five years. Nine players from the team were selected in the MLB Draft, the most for the school since 1995.

Personnel

Roster

Coaching staff

Schedule

! style="" | Regular Season
|- valign="top" 

|-bgcolor=ffbbb
| Feb 17 || VCU* || #9 || Dick Howser Stadium • Tallahassee, FL || L 0–3  || Parrish (1–0) || Carlton (0–1) || Donko (1) || 5,071 || 0–1 || 
|-bgcolor=ccffcc
| Feb 18 || VCU* || #9 || Dick Howser Stadium • Tallahassee, FL || W 12–3 || Sands (1–0) || Dailey (0–1) || None || 4,520 || 1–1 || 
|-bgcolor=ccffcc
| Feb 19 || VCU* || #9 || Dick Howser Stadium • Tallahassee, FL || W 11–3 || Holton (1–0) || Vial (0–1) || None || 5,390 || 2–1 || 
|-bgcolor=ffbbb
| Feb 21 || * || #9 || Dick Howser Stadium • Tallahassee, FL || L 2–4 || Savarese (1–0) || Byrd (0–1) || Perez (1) || 4,144 || 2–2 || 
|-bgcolor=ccffcc
| Feb 24 || * || #9 || Dick Howser Stadium • Tallahassee, FL || W 16–3 || Sands (2–0) || McCord (0–1) || None || 4,286 || 3–2 || 
|-bgcolor=ccffcc
| Feb 25 || Samford* || #9 || Dick Howser Stadium • Tallahassee, FL || W 8–0 || Holton (2–0) || Cazanave (1–1) || None || 4,605 || 4–2 || 
|-bgcolor=ccffcc
| Feb 26 || Samford* || #9 || Dick Howser Stadium • Tallahassee, FL || W 13–4 || Parrish (1–0) || Jones (0–1) || None || 4,392 || 5–2 || 
|-bgcolor=ccffcc
| Feb 28 || at * || #10 || John Sessions Stadium • Jacksonville, FL || W 6–5 || Haney (1–0) || Cassala (0–1) || Carlton (1) || 1,027 || 6–2 || 
|-

|-bgcolor=ccffcc
| Mar 3 || * || #10 || Dick Howser Stadium • Tallahassee, FL || W 18–10 || Voyles (1–0) || Fannon (0–1) || None || 4,035 || 7–2 || 
|-bgcolor=ccffcc
| Mar 4 || Oakland* || #10 || Dick Howser Stadium • Tallahassee, FL || W 12–1 || Holton (3–0) || Palm (0–2) || None || 4,344 || 8–2 || 
|-bgcolor=ccffcc
| Mar 5 || Oakland* || #10 || Dick Howser Stadium • Tallahassee, FL || W 14–6 || Voyles (1–0) || Parr (1–2) || None || 4,429 || 9–2 || 
|-bgcolor=ccffcc
| Mar 7 || at * || #8 || Jay Bergman Field • Orlando, FL || W 5–2 || Byrd (1–1) || Williams (0–2) || Carlton (2) || 3,205 || 10–2 || 
|-bgcolor=ccffcc
| Mar 8 || at UCF* || #8 || Jay Bergman Field • Orlando, FL || W 5–0 || Zirzow (1–0) || Sheridan (2–1) || None || 2,226 || 11–2 || 
|-bgcolor=ffbbb
| Mar 10 ||  || #8 || Dick Howser Stadium • Tallahassee, FL || L 5–8 || Stevens (2–0) || Sands (2–1) || Casey (1) || 4,143 || 11–3 || 0–1
|-bgcolor=ccffcc
| Mar 11 || Boston College || #8 || Dick Howser Stadium • Tallahassee, FL || W 11–1 || Holton (4–0) || Gill (1–3) || None || 4,452 || 12–3 || 1–1
|-bgcolor=ccffcc
| Mar 11 || Boston College || #8 || Dick Howser Stadium • Tallahassee, FL || W 13–0 || Parrish (2–0) || Metzdorf (1–2) || None || 4,452 || 13–3 || 2–1
|-bgcolor=ffbbb
| Mar 14 || at #8 Florida* || #6 || McKethan Stadium • Gainesville, FL || L 0–1  || Baker (1–1) || Karp (0–1) || Dyson (1) || 5,806 || 13–4 || 
|-bgcolor=ffbbb
| Mar 15 || at #22 * || #6 || JetBlue Park • Fort Myers, FL || L 2–5 || Hering (3–1) || Voyles (1–1) || Koerner (5) || 3,489 || 13–5 || 
|-bgcolor=ccffcc
| Mar 17 || at  || #6 || English Field • Blacksburg, VA || W 9–2 || Sands (3–1) || Naughton (1–3) || None || 153 || 14–5 || 3–1
|-bgcolor=ffbbb
| Mar 18 || at Virginia Tech || #6 || English Field • Blacksburg, VA || L 12–13 || Coward (4–0) || Zirzow (1–1) || McGarity (4) || 645 || 14–6 || 3–2
|-bgcolor=ffbbb
| Mar 19 || at Virginia Tech || #6 || English Field • Blacksburg, VA || L 0–17 || Anderson (4–1) || Parrish (2–1) || None || 441 || 14–7 || 3–3 
|-bgcolor=ccffcc
| Mar 21 || Jacksonville* || #18 || Dick Howser Stadium • Tallahassee, FL || W 10–9 || Carlton (1–1) || Cassala (0–2) || None || 4,462 || 15–7 || 
|-bgcolor=ccffcc
| Mar 24 || at  || #18 || Frank Eck Stadium • South Bend, IN  || W 8–2 || Sands (4–1) || Bielak (1–4) || None || 701 || 16–7 || 4–3
|-bgcolor=ccffcc
| Mar 24 || at Notre Dame || #18 || Frank Eck Stadium • South Bend, IN  || W 8–311 || Voyles (2–0) || Solomon (1–2) || None || 701 || 17–7 || 5–3
|-bgcolor=ccffcc
| Mar 25 || at Notre Dame || #18 || Frank Eck Stadium • South Bend, IN || W 5–1 || Parrish (3–1) || Bass (1–3) || None || 420 || 18–7 || 6–3
|-bgcolor=ffbbb
| Mar 28 || vs. #11 Florida* || #12 || Baseball Grounds of Jacksonville • Jacksonville, FL || L 1–4 || Milchin (1–1) || Karp (0–2) || Byrne (2) || 8,924 || 18–8 || 
|-bgcolor=ffbbb
| Mar 31 || #7  || #12 || Dick Howser Stadium • Tallahassee, FL || L 1–3 || Bukauskas (5–0) || Sands (4–2) || Hiatt (10) || 4,730 || 18–9 || 6–4
|-

|-bgcolor=ffbbb
| Apr 1 || #7 North Carolina || #12 || Dick Howser Stadium • Tallahassee, FL || L 2–511 || Hiatt (1–1) || Carlton (1–2) || None || 5,603 || 18–10 || 6–5
|-bgcolor=ffbbb
| Apr 2 || #7 North Carolina || #12 || Dick Howser Stadium • Tallahassee, FL || L 7–9 || Baum (4–0) || Haney (1–1) || None || 4,480 || 18–11 || 6–6
|-bgcolor=ccffcc
| Apr 4 || #9 Florida Gulf Coast* ||  || Dick Howser Stadium • Tallahassee, FL || W 7–6 || Carlton (2–2) || Hering (4–2) || None || 4,038 || 19–11 || 
|-bgcolor=ccffcc
| Apr 5 || #9 Florida Gulf Coast* ||  || Dick Howser Stadium • Tallahassee, FL || W 3–25 || Stewart (1–0) || Gray (3–1) || None || 3,624 || 20–11 || 
|-bgcolor=ccffcc
| Apr 7 || at  ||  || Doak Field • Raleigh, NC || W 16–7 || Sands (5–2) || Adler (3–4) || None || 2,853 || 21–11 || 7–6
|-bgcolor=ffbbb
| Apr 8 || at NC State ||  || Doak Field • Raleigh, NC || L 3–4 || Brown (1–0) || Holton (4–1) || Beckman (1) || 2,975 || 21–12 || 7–7
|-bgcolor=ffbbb
| Apr 9 || at NC State ||  || Doak Field • Raleigh, NC || L 4–8 || Bienlien (2–1) || Parrish (3–2) || Feeney (1) || 2,858 || 21–13 || 7–8
|-bgcolor=ffbbb
| Apr 11 || #18 Florida* ||  || Dick Howser Stadium • Tallahassee, FL || L 7–10 || Horvath (1–0) || Haney (1–2) || None || 5,944 || 21–14 ||
|-bgcolor=ffbbb
| Apr 15 || #4 Clemson ||  || Dick Howser Stadium • Tallahassee, FL || L 10–12 || Gilliam (2–0) || Carlton (2–3) || None || 5,753 || 21–15 || 7–9
|-bgcolor=ccffcc
| Apr 16 || #4 Clemson ||  || Dick Howser Stadium • Tallahassee, FL || W 7–3 || Holton (5–1) || Eubanks (5–3) || None || 4,010 || 22–15 || 8–9
|-bgcolor=ccffcc
| Apr 17 || #4 Clemson ||  || Dick Howser Stadium • Tallahassee, FL || W 7–6 || Byrd (2–1) || Hennessy (1–1) || None  || 4,046 || 23–15 || 9–9 
|-bgcolor=ccffcc
| Apr 19 || * ||  || Dick Howser Stadium • Tallahassee, FL || W 7–3  || Kwiatkowski (1–0) || Senger (0–2) || None || 3,937 || 24–15 || 
|-bgcolor=ccffcc
| Apr 21 || at Miami (FL) ||  || Mark Light Field at Alex Rodriguez Park • Coral Gables, FL || W 6–3  || Voyles (3–0) || Bargfeldt (4–3) || Carlton (3) || 3,523 || 25–15 || 10–9
|-bgcolor=ffbbb
| Apr 22 || at Miami (FL) ||  || Mark Light Field at Alex Rodriguez Park • Coral Gables, FL || L 4–510  || Cabezas (1–2) || Byrd (2–2) || None || 4,999 || 25–16 || 10–10
|-bgcolor="#cccccc"
| Apr 23 || at Miami (FL) ||  || Mark Light Field at Alex Rodriguez Park • Coral Gables, FL || colspan=7 style="text-align:center;"|Cancelled
|-bgcolor=ccffcc
| Apr 25 || at Stetson* ||  || Melching Field at Conrad Park • DeLand, FL || W 11–5  || Parrish (4–2) || Stark (2–3) || None || 1,798 || 26–16 ||
|-bgcolor=ccffcc
| Apr 28 || #12  ||  || Dick Howser Stadium • Tallahassee, FL || W 6–4  || Haney (2–2) || Harrington (3–2) || Carlton (4) || 4,021 || 27–16 || 11–10
|-bgcolor=ffbbb
| Apr 29 || #12 Virginia ||  || Dick Howser Stadium • Tallahassee, FL || L 0–8  || Haseley (7–1) || Karp (0–3) || Doyle (12) || 4,171 || 27–17 || 11–11
|-
|-bgcolor=ffbbb
| Apr 30 || #12 Virginia ||  || Dick Howser Stadium • Tallahassee, FL || L 5–7  || Murdock (3–1) || Holton (5–2) || Bettinger (1) || 4,133 || 27–18 || 11–12
|-

|-bgcolor=ccffcc
| May 5 || * ||  || Dick Howser Stadium • Tallahassee, FL || W 9–8  || Carlton (3–3) || Arobio (3–4) || None || 3,647 || 28–18 || 
|-bgcolor=ccffcc
| May 6 || Pacific* ||  || Dick Howser Stadium • Tallahassee, FL || W 18–5  || Holton (6–2) || Shreve (1–5) || Voyles (1) || 3,994 || 29–18 ||  
|-bgcolor=ccffcc
| May 6 || Pacific* ||  || Dick Howser Stadium • Tallahassee, FL || W 5–3  || Karp (1–3) || Casad (2–3) || None || 3,994 || 30–18 ||   
|-bgcolor=ccffcc
| May 7 || Pacific* ||  || Dick Howser Stadium • Tallahassee, FL || W 5–3  || Parrish (5–2) || Reynoso (4–6) || Byrd (1) || 3,719 || 31–18 ||    
|-bgcolor=ccffcc
| May 9 || Jacksonville* ||  || Dick Howser Stadium • Tallahassee, FL || W 21–28 || Zirzow (2–1) || Cassala (0–3) || None || 3,716 || 32–18 ||
|-bgcolor=ffbbb
| May 13 || #23 Wake Forest ||  || Dick Howser Stadium • Tallahassee, FL || L 3–4 || Peluse (3–1) || Sands (5–3) || Roberts (6) || 3,887 || 32–19 || 11–13
|-bgcolor=ccffcc
| May 13 || #23 Wake Forest ||  || Dick Howser Stadium • Tallahassee, FL || W 4–0 || Holton (7–2) || Sellers (3–5) || None || 4,658 || 33–19 || 12–13
|-bgcolor=ffbbb
| May 14 || #23 Wake Forest ||  || Dick Howser Stadium • Tallahassee, FL || L 9–10 || McCarren (5–3) || Parrish (5–3) || None || 3,835 || 33–20 || 12–14
|-bgcolor=ccffcc
| May 18 || at #2 Louisville ||  || Jim Patterson Stadium • Louisville, KY || W 12–9 || Voyles (4–0) || Sparger (4–1) || Carlton (5) || 3,487 || 34–20 || 13–14
|-bgcolor=ccffcc
| May 19 || at #2 Louisville ||  || Jim Patterson Stadium • Louisville, KY || W 8–2 || Holton (8–2) || McClure (7–2) || None || 3,359 || 35–20 || 14–14
|-bgcolor="#cccccc"
| May 20 || at #2 Louisville ||  || Jim Patterson Stadium • Louisville, KY || colspan=7 style="text-align:center;"|Cancelled
|-

|-
! style="" | Post-Season
|- 

|-bgcolor=ccffcc
| May 24 || vs. (12) Notre Dame || (8) || Louisville Slugger Field • Louisville, KY || W 5–312 || Karp (2–3) || Guenther (2–6) || None || 2,944 || 36–20 || 1–0
|-bgcolor=ccffcc
| May 26 || vs. #4 (1) Louisville || (8) || Louisville Slugger Field • Louisville, KY || W 6–2 || Holton (9–2) || McClure (7–3) || None || 8,843 || 37–20 || 2–0
|-bgcolor=ccffcc
| May 27 || vs. (9) Duke || (8) || Louisville Slugger Field • Louisville, KY(Semifinal) || W 5–1 || Sands (6–3) || Laskey (4–5) || None ||  || 38–20 || 3–0
|-bgcolor=ccffcc
| May 28 || vs. #5 (2) North Carolina || (8) || Louisville Slugger Field • Louisville, KY(Championship) || W 7–3 || Byrd (3–2) || Hiatt (4–2) || None || 4,772 || 39–20 || 4–0
|-

|-bgcolor=ffbbb
| Jun 2 || (4) Tennessee Tech || #18 (1) || Dick Howser Stadium • Tallahassee, FL(Tallahassee Regional) || L 1–3 || Moths (5–1) || Carlton (3–4) || None || 3,514 || 39–21 || 0–1
|-bgcolor=ccffcc
| Jun 3 || (2) UCF || #18 (1) || Dick Howser Stadium • Tallahassee, FL(Tallahassee Regional) || W 6–1 || Holton (10–2) || Williams (5–4) || None || 2,967 || 40–21 || 1–1
|-bgcolor=ccffcc 
| Jun 4 || (4) Tennessee Tech || #18 (1) || Dick Howser Stadium • Tallahassee, FL(Tallahassee Regional) || W 5–3 ||  Byrd (4–2) || Roberts (1–4) || Carlton (6) || 2,872 || 41–21 || 2–1
|-bgcolor=ccffcc
| Jun 4 || (3) Auburn || #18 (1) || Dick Howser Stadium • Tallahassee, FL(Tallahassee Regional) || W 8–710 || Carlton (4–4) || Mitchell (5–4) || None || 2,872 || 42–21 || 3–1
|-bgcolor=ccffcc
| Jun 5 || (3) Auburn || #18 (1) || Dick Howser Stadium • Tallahassee, FL(Tallahassee Regional) || W 6–0 || Zirzow (3–1) || Klobosits (0–1) || None || 4,211 || 43–21 || 4–1
|-bgcolor=ccffcc
| Jun 10 || #13 Sam Houston State || #10 (12) || Dick Howser Stadium • Tallahassee, FL(Tallahassee Super Regional) || W 7–6 || Carlton (5–4) || Mikolajchak (0–4) || None || 4,253 || 44–21 || 5–1
|-bgcolor=ccffcc
| Jun 11 || #13 Sam Houston State || #10 (12) || Dick Howser Stadium • Tallahassee, FL(Tallahassee Super Regional) || W 19–0 || Parrish (6–3) || Donica (9–3) || None || 4,391 || 45–21 || 6–1
|-

|-bgcolor=ffbbb
| Jun 17 || vs. #2 (4) LSU || #6 (12) || TD Ameritrade Park • Omaha, NE || L 4–5 || Poche (11–3) || Holton (10–3) || Hess (2) || 25,305 || 45–22 || 0–1
|-bgcolor=ccffcc 
| Jun 19 || vs. #7 Cal State Fullerton || #6 (12) || TD Ameritrade Park • Omaha, NE || W 6–4 || Haney (3–2) || Pabich (1–3) || None || 17,229 || 46–22 || 1–1
|-bgcolor=ffbbb
| Jun 21 || vs. #2 (4) LSU || #6 (12) || TD Ameritrade Park • Omaha, NE || L 4–7 || Poche (12–3)  || Sands (6–4) || None || 22,872 || 46–23 || 1–2
|-

|-
|-
| Legend:       = Win       = Loss       = PostponementBold = Florida State team memberRankings from Collegiate Baseball; parenthesis indicate tournament seedings.

Rankings

Awards

Watchlists
Golden Spikes Award
Dylan Busby
Taylor Walls

Honors

All-ACC

All-Americans

MLB Draft
The following players were selected in the 2017 MLB Draft:

References

External links
 Media Guide

Florida State Seminoles
Florida State Seminoles baseball seasons
Florida State
College World Series seasons
2017